Tracy Mark Franz (born March 28, 1960) is a former American football guard who played for the San Francisco 49ers in the National Football League (NFL). He played college football at San Jose State University.

References 

1960 births
Living people
American football offensive guards
San Jose State Spartans football players
San Francisco 49ers players